Japan participated in the 2011 Asian Winter Games in Almaty and Astana, Kazakhstan from January 30, 2011 to February 6, 2011.

Figure skating
 
Japan will send 6 figure skaters.
Men

Women

Ice dance

References

Nations at the 2011 Asian Winter Games
Asian Winter Games
Japan at the Asian Winter Games